Portugal selected its entry for the Eurovision Song Contest 1999 through the Festival da Canção contest, organised by the Portuguese broadcaster Rádio e Televisão de Portugal (RTP). The winner of the festival was Rui Bandeira with the song "Como tudo começou", which represented Portugal at the Contest in Jerusalem on 29 May.

Before Eurovision
Originally, Portugal would have been relegated from the contest due to low average score over the past 5 years. However Latvia, who originally planned to participate, withdrew, and so did Hungary, who had the next highest average score, ultimately allowing Portugal to compete.

Festival da Canção 1999 
Festival da Canção 1999 was the 36th edition of the festival, and was used to select the 35th Portuguese entry at the Eurovision Song Contest.

Final 
The final was held on 8 March 1999 at the Pavilhão Atlântico in Lisbon, hosted by Manuel Luís Goucha and Alexandra Lencastre. Eight songs competed in the contest, with the winner selected by the votes of 11 regional juries. The winner was Rui Bandeira with "Como tudo começou".

At Eurovision 
On the night of the contest Bandeira performed 16th, following Sweden and preceding Ireland. The song received 12 points at the close of the voting, placing 21st of 23 countries competing, relegating Portugal from the 2000 contest.

Voting

References

External links
Portuguese National Final 1999

1999
Countries in the Eurovision Song Contest 1999
Eurovision